Paul Francis Knitter (born February 25, 1939) is an American theologian. He is currently an emeritus professor at Union Theological Seminary, where he has served as the Paul Tillich Professor of Theology, World Religions and Culture since 2007. He is also Emeritus Professor of Theology at Xavier University in Cincinnati, where he taught for 28 years before moving to Union. Knitter is known for his work on religious pluralism and multiple religious belonging, particularly regarding Buddhism and Christianity.

Life and career
Knitter was born in Chicago, Illinois.  Ordained as a priest in the Roman Catholic Church shortly after the Second Vatican Council, he holds a licentiate from the Pontifical Gregorian University in Rome (1966), as well as a doctorate from the University of Marburg, Germany (1972). Knitter received permission to leave the priesthood in 1975, becoming a professor of theology at Xavier. He married Cathy Cornell, a Buddhist meditation teacher, in 1984.

Since publishing his book, No Other Name? (1985), Knitter has been widely known for his religious pluralism. Knitter, who identifies as a "Buddhist Christian,"  explores the phenomenon of multiple religious belonging in Buddhism and Christianity in Without Buddha, I Could Not Be a Christian (2009).

In 1984, Knitter was one of 97 theologians and religious persons who signed A Catholic Statement on Pluralism and Abortion, calling for pluralism and discussion within the Catholic Church regarding the church's position on abortion.

Knitter is a board member of CRISPAZ (Christians for Peace in El Salvador).

Criticism
Along with his friend and colleague, the Protestant philosopher of religion John Hick, Knitter came under criticism of Cardinal Joseph Ratzinger, then-prefect of Congregation of the Doctrine of the Faith and later Pope Benedict XVI, for "relativism." Similar concerns have been raised by other theologians. Catherine Cornille, addressing Knitter's claim that Jesus is not the "only" savior in Jesus and the Other Names, comments: "Not only are the religious views of different traditions at times directly opposed or mutually exclusive, but the very claim of ultimacy of one religion necessarily precludes the truth of the claims of others." Robert Magliola criticizes Knitter's proposed "one universal Spirit" concept, asserting that it perpetuates the modernist idea of "equable holism" or "openness" (the "modern idol") rather than the "jagged, asymmetrical" nature of reality. Critiquing Knitter's views on religious double belonging, Joseph A. Bracken argues that "in ethical reflection one should begin with the recognition of the Otherness of the Other" rather than with "the sustained meditation by the self on one's moral responsibility for others": 

In a review of Jesus and Buddha: Friends in Conversation, Magliola critiqued Knitter and Roger Haight's discussion of the possibility of double belonging in Catholicism and Mahayana Buddhism.:

Works

Thesis

Books

See also

 Wilfred Cantwell Smith

References

Living people
Pontifical Gregorian University alumni
University of Marburg alumni
Union Theological Seminary (New York City) faculty
1939 births
People from Chicago